Matthew McDonough (born 26 January 1994) is a former professional Australian rules footballer who played for the Richmond Football Club in the Australian Football League (AFL). Lockleys premiership player 2020.

He was drafted by Richmond with pick 42 in the 2012 national draft. He made his debut in round 21 of the 2013 AFL season, as a late replacement for Matthew White. He was delisted at the conclusion of the 2015 season.

References

External links

Living people
1994 births
Australian rules footballers from South Australia
Richmond Football Club players
Woodville-West Torrens Football Club players
Coburg Football Club players